The Big Fill was an engineering project on the First transcontinental railroad in the U.S. state of Utah. To avoid a costly  tunnel through mountainous terrain east of Promontory Summit, Central Pacific engineers mapped an alternate route that still needed to span the deep Spring Creek Ravine.

Events of 1869
In February 1869, the construction firm of Benson, Farr, & West began construction on a raised bed across the ravine. The cuts for the Big Fill required 1,500 kegs of black powder.

Big Trestle

 east of the Big Fill, the Union Pacific line was also attempting to cross the same ravine. The Union Pacific was several months behind Central Pacific, and opted to build a wooden trestle instead of using an earthen fill, starting on March 28. The Big Trestle was built in 36 days and was completed on May 5, only 5 days before the golden spike ceremony at Promontory Summit.

Since Union Pacific were responsible for the transcontinental route east of Promontory, the track was laid across the Big Trestle. However, shortly after completion, the trestle was faulted as weak; in addition, there was a grade across the trestle and a curve at one end.

Line moved
Because Congress had fixed the point of junction as Ogden, not Promontory, controversy over the control of the segment between Promontory and Ogden ensued, but the two companies eventually came to an agreement to move the junction to Ogden, with Central Pacific compensating Union Pacific for the cost of construction materials and labor. Six months after the completion ceremony, Central Pacific was awarded control of that segment. They opted to move the rail line from the poor-quality Big Trestle to the Big Fill, where it remained in use until the rails were removed in 1942, although main line traffic was moved off the Promontory route in 1903 with the completion of the Lucin Cutoff.

Today both sites are part of the Golden Spike National Historic Site; a walking trail from the East Grade Auto Tour takes tourists to view the Big Fill and the remains of the Big Trestle.

References

External links

National Park Service: Golden Spike National Historic Site
 Part 1  Part 2  Part 3

Rail infrastructure in Utah
Southern Pacific Railroad
Union Pacific Railroad